The 2021 French Open – Women's Singles Qualifying was a series of tennis matches that took place from 24 May to 28 May 2021 to determine the sixteen qualifiers into the main draw of the 2021 French Open – Women's singles, and, if necessary, the lucky losers.

This qualifying round expanded to 128 players in the tournament to allow 16 players will be qualified for the main draw. Previous years had 96 players in the draw as this is the last Grand Slam to change this feature.

Seeds

Qualifiers

Lucky losers

Draw

First qualifier

Second qualifier

Third qualifier

Fourth qualifier

Fifth qualifier

Sixth qualifier

Seventh qualifier

Eighth qualifier

Ninth qualifier

Tenth qualifier

Eleventh qualifier

Twelfth qualifier

Thirteenth qualifier

Fourteenth qualifier

Fifteenth qualifier

Sixteenth qualifier

References 
 Qualifying Draw

Women's Singles Qualifying
French Open - Women's Singles Qualifying
French Open by year – Qualifying